The Journal of Public Economics is a monthly peer-reviewed academic journal covering public economics, with particular emphasis on the application of modern economic theory and methods of quantitative analysis. It provides a forum for discussion of public policy of interest to an international readership. It was established in 1972 by Tony Atkinson and is published by Elsevier. The current editors-in-chief are John Friedman (Brown University) and Wojciech Kopczuk (Columbia University). According to the Journal Citation Reports, the journal has a 2019 impact factor of 2.218.

References

External links

Economics journals
Elsevier academic journals
Monthly journals
Publications established in 1972
Public economics
English-language journals